Tomorrow at Ten is a 1962 British thriller film directed by Lance Comfort and starring John Gregson, Robert Shaw and Kenneth Cope.

Plot
A man calling himself Marlow kidnaps Jonathan Chester, the young son of wealthy industrialist Anthony Chester, and locks him in a rented house with a golliwog containing a time bomb. He then goes to see the boy's father and announces that he will only reveal his whereabouts once he has been paid £50,000 (a large sum at the time) and is safely in Brazil. The boy's nanny alerts the police and Inspector Parnell arrives to discourage Chester from paying up lest it encourages giving in to blackmailers' demands. Marlow then reveals that the time bomb will go off at 10 a.m. the next day, killing Jonathan. This is too much for Chester who attacks Marlow, causing the crook serious injuries from which he later dies, leaving the police with little time or indication as to where to find Jonathan.

Cast
 John Gregson as Inspector Parnell
 Robert Shaw as Marlow
 Alec Clunes as Anthony Chester
 Alan Wheatley as Assistant Commissioner Bewley
 Kenneth Cope as Sergeant Grey
 Ernest Clark as Dr Towers
 Piers Bishop as Jonathan Chester
 Helen Cherry as Robbie
 William Hartnell as Freddie Maddox
 Betty McDowall as Mrs Parnell  
 Harry Fowler as Smiley  
 Renée Houston as Masie Maddox
 Alan Curtis as Inspector
 Noel Howlett as Brain specialist
 Trevor Reid as Q Detective
 Ray Smith as Briggs

Critical reception
Tomorrow at Ten was selected by the film historians Steve Chibnall and Brian McFarlane as one of the 15 most meritorious British B films made between World War II and 1970. While they praise the characterisation, the performances, the production design, the cinematography and the screenplay, they say that "the film's real strength is in the direction of the veteran Lance Comfort in one of his last films".

References

External links
 
Tomorrow at Ten at BFI Screenonline

1962 films
1960s thriller films
British thriller films
Films directed by Lance Comfort
Films shot at MGM-British Studios
1960s English-language films
1960s British films